Toomas Tein (born 1955) is an Estonian politician. He was a member of X Riigikogu.

He has been a member of Estonian Reform Party.

References

Living people
1955 births
Estonian Reform Party politicians
Members of the Riigikogu, 2003–2007
Date of birth missing (living people)